Bykovo is an urban locality (a work settlement) in Ramensky District of Moscow Oblast, located  southeast of Moscow. Population:

History
It was founded in 1861–1862 upon construction of the Moscow-Ryazan railroad, replacing the former village  to the south. Work settlement status was granted to it in 1962.

Economy
The Bykovo Airport and an aircraft repair facility are located here.

Notable people
Bykovo is a home (and a place of birth) for Pavel Chukhrai, Vladimir Sorokin, and Nikolay Rastorguyev.

References

Urban-type settlements in Moscow Oblast